Harald-Paul Keerdo (4 April 1891 Tartu – 6 January 1950 Tallinn) was an Estonian communist politician and writer. He was a member of I Riigikogu.

References

1891 births
1950 deaths
Politicians from Tartu
Writers from Tartu
People from Kreis Dorpat
[[Communist Party of Estonia politicians]]
Estonian Independent Socialist Workers' Party politicians
Workers' United Front politicians
Members of the Central Committee of the Communist Party of Estonia
Members of the Riigikogu, 1920–1923
Members of the Riigikogu, 1923–1926
Members of the Supreme Soviet of the Estonian Soviet Socialist Republic, 1940–1947
Members of the Supreme Soviet of the Estonian Soviet Socialist Republic, 1947–1951
Estonian male short story writers
Estonian journalists
Prisoners and detainees of Estonia
Russian military personnel of World War I
Hugo Treffner Gymnasium alumni
Burials at Metsakalmistu